The BOSS SP-505 Groove Sampling Workstation/SP-505 is a sampling workstation made by Boss Corporation, which is a division of Roland Corporation. The digital sampler is part of the SP family and was released in the year of 2002, as a follow-up to Roland’s SP-303 installment. Ironically, both the 303 and 505 installments were succeeded by the release of Roland's SP-404 in the year of 2005.

Features

 Having the traditional features of the Roland & Boss Grooveboxes, the 505 has the ability to record audio directly via line/mic, or import/export industry-standard WAV and AIF files via SmartMedia card. 
 The SP-505’s internal memory provides over two minutes of CD-quality mono sampling, which can be expanded to over one hour using an optional 128MB SmartMedia card. The Smartmedia cards range from 8Mb to 128Mb. 
 The interface design of the sampler consists of 12 large pads, and three control knobs. This design is now traditional to SP installments, with individual distinctions throughout installments. 
The are 64 onboard Tones with drums, bass, keyboard, and also synth sounds. 
 29 effects like Tape Echo, Isolator and Vinyl Simulator, that can be extensively utilized by resampling and realtime control.
 Built-in microphone for sampling
 CD-quality sound
 Chop function divides loops and maps individual samples to pads
 Pitch function for playing back samples at new pitches as on a keyboard
 BPM Sync function instantly matches up to 16 phrases to the same tempo
 Sounds are imported by form of .WAV/AIFF files via SmartMedia, and by Coaxial/Optical Digital inputs
 8-voice polyphony[2] (resample polyphony: 4 mono voices OR 1 stereo voice and 2 mono voices OR 2 stereo voices)
 Runs on AC power only (unlike other SP installments, there is no battery power option).

Notable users
Despite not initially becoming as popular as the 303 and 404 installments, the 505 is well-associated with hip-hop producer Madlib.

See also
Boss SP-202
Boss SP-303

External links
SP-Forums.com - An active forum dedicated to Roland's SP range

References

Roland
Boss Corporation
Workstations
D2
Grooveboxes
Music sequencers
Sound modules
Music workstations
Hip hop production
Japanese inventions